"Dallas" is a song written by American country music artists Alan Jackson and Keith Stegall, and recorded by Jackson. It was released in December 1991 as the third single from Jackson's second album, Don't Rock the Jukebox. The song peaked at number 1 on the Billboard Hot Country Singles & Tracks chart, Jackson's fourth consecutive single to top the chart, as well as number 1 on the Canadian RPM Country Tracks chart, Jackson's fourth single to top that chart also.

Background and writing
According to the liner notes of his 1995 album The Greatest Hits Collection, Jackson was inspired to write the song after having played at Billy Bob's in Fort Worth, Texas. After playing the show, he commented that he "wished Dallas was in Tennessee" and based the song off that comment.

Content
"Dallas" is a song in which the male narrator tells of a lover named Dallas who has left him for Dallas, Texas. He then goes on to say that he wishes that Dallas were in Tennessee — both the city and his former lover.

Critical reception
Kevin John Coyne of Country Universe gave the song a B+ grade," calling it "a simple enough song, yet with some clever lyrics, a generous dose of pedal steel and Jackson's typical smooth, agreeable vocals."

Peak chart positions
"Dallas" debuted on the U.S. Billboard Hot Country Singles & Tracks for the week of January 4, 1992.

Year-end charts

References

1991 singles
Alan Jackson songs
Songs about Texas
Songs written by Alan Jackson
Songs written by Keith Stegall
Song recordings produced by Keith Stegall
Song recordings produced by Scott Hendricks
Arista Nashville singles
1991 songs